The SA Fillies Classic is a South Australian Jockey Club Group 3 Thoroughbred horse race for fillies aged three years old, over a distance of 2500 metres at Morphettville Racecourse in Adelaide, Australia during the SAJC Autumn Carnival.

History

After the introduction of the Australasian Oaks into the SAJC Racing Calendar the distance of the race was extended to 2400 metres. Prior to 1985 the race was held in the Spring.
In 1979 the race was run at Cheltenham Park Racecourse and in 1980 the race was held at Victoria Park Racecourse.

Name
1951–2008 - South Australian Oaks
2009 onwards - SA Fillies Classic

Distance
1951–1972 -  miles (~2000 metres)
1973–1978 – 2000 metres
1979 – 1850 metres
1980–1985 – 2000 metres
1986–1994 – 2400 metres
1995–2009 – 2500 metres
2010–2011 – 2400 metres
2012 onwards - 2500 metres

Grade
1951–1979 - Principal Race
1980–2004 - Group 1
2005–2006 - Group 2
2007 onwards - Group 3

Winners

 2022 - The Amazonian
 2021 - Mimi's Award
 2020 - Realm Of Flowers
 2019 - Moor Gait
 2018 - Pleasuring
 2017 - Ana Royale
 2016 - Chabaud
 2015 - Okahu Bay
 2014 - Rezoned
 2013 - Wowee
 2012 - Red Typhoon
 2011 - Precious Lorriane
 2010 - Danaupair Starlet
 2009 - Zapurple
 2008 - Queen Of Queens
 2007 - Watches
 2006 - Dream The Dream
 2005 - Irish Darling
 2004 - Dowry
 2003 - Larrocha
 2002 - She’s Archie
 2001 - Asia
 2000 - Voile D’Or
 1999 - Episode
 1998 - Zacheline
 1997 - Derobe
 1996 - Miss Margaret
 1995 - Cherontessa
 1994 - Pindi
 1993 - Our Tristalight
 1992 - Ramyah
 1991 - Lee’s Bid
 1990 - Gamine
 1989 - Heavenly Body
 1988 - Lady Liberty
 1987 - Marmalitre
 1986 - Cimarra
 1985 - †race not held
 1984 - Neliska
 1983 - Casey Belle
 1982 - Irish Heiress
 1981 - Cache
 1980 - Brunisse
 1979 - Argent Wonder
 1978 - Runaway Bride
 1977 - Deesse
 1976 - In Pursuit
 1975 - Ace Queen
 1974 - Fondness
 1973 - Ready Or Not
 1972 - Little Papoose
 1971 - Persian Bronze
 1970 - Rain Amore
 1969 - Goliette
 1968 - Valide
 1967 - My Lady Fair
 1966 - Lady Twilight
 1965 - Te Parae
 1964 - Bluepak
 1963 - Raindear
 1962 - Lady Fontaine
 1961 - Queen Dassie
 1960 - Kind Mount
 1959 - Rose Of Summer
 1958 - Demeter
 1957 - Gentle Touch
 1956 - Sleep Tight
 1955 - Wine Lover
 1954 - Genteel Star
 1953 - Never Rest
 1952 - Sadiya
 1951 - Gay Comedy

† Race not held in that year due to switch of race date in the racing calendar. The SAJC moved the race to the autumn for the 1985–86 racing season.

See also
 List of Australian Group races
 Group races

References

Horse races in Australia
Flat horse races for three-year-old fillies
Sport in Adelaide